The 2015 APBA Gold Cup, the 111th running of the APBA Gold Cup race and the 50th running of the local event, was held on July 24, 25, and 26, 2015 on the Columbia River in Kennewick, Washington. Contested over eight heats and a final on the 2.5-mile (4 km) oval, it was the first points-payin race of the 2015 H1 Unlimited season after the original first race, the Indiana's Governors Cup, was converted into an exhibition event after numerous delays. Jimmy Shane won the race, his second consecutive and all-time APBA Gold Cup win, the first win of the season, and the third APBA Gold Cup win for Miss Madison. J. Michael Kelly finished second, while Cal Phipps, Brian Perkins, and Scott Liddycoat rounded out the top five.

Jean Theoret won the pole with a speed of 160.509 miles per hour (258.314 km/h). Jimmy Shane, J. Michael Kelly, and Jean Theoret each won two heats apiece, with Scott Liddycoat and Cal Phipps winning the two remaining heats.

Qualifying

However, due to an N2 violation, the team was fined $100 following the time trials.

Heats

Heat 1A (July 25)

Results

Violations

Heat 1B (July 25)

Results

Violations

Heat 2A (July 26)

Heat 2A was scheduled to be run on Saturday, July 25, but, due to high winds, was moved to Sunday.

Results

Violations

Heat 2B (July 26)

Like Heat 2A, Heat 2B was scheduled to be run on Saturday, July 25, but, due to high winds, was moved to Sunday.

Results

Heat 3A (July 26)

Results

Violations

Heat 3B (July 26)

However, Theoret committed an unknown Level II penalty and thus was fined $250 and had 50 points deducted from his heat earnings.

Results

Violations

Heat 4A (July 26)

Results

Violations

Heat 4B (July 26)

Results

Violations

Final Heat (July 26)

Jean Theoret dominated the final, but was later disqualified due to a DMZ violation.

Results

Violations

References

2015 in sports in Washington (state)
Sports competitions in Washington (state)